Jason Castro may refer to:

Jason Castro (singer) (born 1987), American singer-songwriter, contestant of TV show American Idol
Jason Castro (album), the self-titled debut studio album recorded by Jason Castro
Jason Castro (baseball) (born 1987), American baseball player
Jayson Castro (born 1986), Filipino basketball player

Castro, Joseph